La Frantz Apartments is a historic three-story building in Ogden, Utah. It was built in 1919-1920 for investor William J. Stephens, and named for one of his sons, William La Frantz Stephens. It has been listed on the National Register of Historic Places since December 31, 1987.

References

Buildings and structures in Ogden, Utah
National Register of Historic Places in Weber County, Utah
Residential buildings completed in 1919
1919 establishments in Utah